Theo Allenbach (11 January 1925 – 28 May 2004) was a Swiss cross-country skier. He competed in the men's 18 kilometre event at the 1948 Winter Olympics.

References

External links
 

1925 births
2004 deaths
Swiss male cross-country skiers
Swiss male Nordic combined skiers
Olympic cross-country skiers of Switzerland
Olympic Nordic combined skiers of Switzerland
Cross-country skiers at the 1948 Winter Olympics
Nordic combined skiers at the 1948 Winter Olympics
Sportspeople from the canton of Bern